In mathematics, the Clausen function, introduced by , is a transcendental, special function of a single variable. It can variously be expressed in the form of a definite integral, a trigonometric series, and various other forms. It is intimately connected with the polylogarithm, inverse tangent integral, polygamma function, Riemann zeta function, Dirichlet eta function, and Dirichlet beta function.

The Clausen function of order 2 – often referred to as the Clausen function, despite being but one of a class of many – is given by the integral:

In the range  the sine function inside the absolute value sign remains strictly positive, so the absolute value signs may be omitted. The Clausen function also has the Fourier series representation:

The Clausen functions, as a class of functions, feature extensively in many areas of modern mathematical research, particularly in relation to the evaluation of many classes of logarithmic and polylogarithmic integrals, both definite and indefinite. They also have numerous applications with regard to the summation of hypergeometric series, summations involving the inverse of the central binomial coefficient, sums of the polygamma function, and Dirichlet L-series.

Basic properties

The Clausen function (of order 2) has simple zeros at all (integer) multiples of  since if  is an integer, then 

It has maxima at 

and minima at 

The following properties are immediate consequences of the series definition:

See .

General definition

More generally, one defines the two generalized Clausen functions:

which are valid for complex z with Re z >1. The definition may be extended to all of the complex plane through analytic continuation.

When z is replaced with a non-negative integer, the standard Clausen functions are defined by the following Fourier series:

N.B. The SL-type Clausen functions have the alternative notation  and are sometimes referred to as the Glaisher–Clausen functions (after James Whitbread Lee Glaisher, hence the GL-notation).

Relation to the Bernoulli polynomials

This connection is apparent from the Fourier series representations of the Bernoulli polynomials:

Setting  in the above, and then rearranging the terms gives the following closed form (polynomial) expressions:

where the Bernoulli polynomials  are defined in terms of the Bernoulli numbers  by the relation:

Explicit evaluations derived from the above include:

Duplication formula

For , the duplication formula can be proven directly from the integral definition (see also  for the result – although no proof is given):

For higher order Clausen functions, duplication formulae can be obtained from the one given above; simply replace  with the dummy variable , and integrate over the interval  Applying the same process repeatedly yields:

And more generally, upon induction on 

Use of the generalized duplication formula allows for an extension of the result for the Clausen function of order 2, involving Catalan's constant. For 

Where  is the Dirichlet beta function.

Proof of the duplication formula

From the integral definition,

Apply the duplication formula for the sine function,  to obtain

Apply the substitution  on both integrals:

On that last integral, set , and use the trigonometric identity  to show that:

 

 

Therefore,

Derivatives of general-order Clausen functions

Direct differentiation of the Fourier series expansions for the Clausen functions give:

By appealing to the First Fundamental Theorem Of Calculus, we also have:

Relation to the inverse tangent integral

The inverse tangent integral is defined on the interval  by

It has the following closed form in terms of the Clausen function:

Proof of the inverse tangent integral relation

From the integral definition of the inverse tangent integral, we have

Performing an integration by parts

Apply the substitution  to obtain

For that last integral, apply the transform : to get

Finally, as with the proof of the Duplication formula, the substitution  reduces that last integral to

Thus

Relation to the Barnes' G-function

For real , the Clausen function of second order can be expressed in terms of the Barnes G-function and (Euler) Gamma function:

Or equivalently

See .

Relation to the polylogarithm

The Clausen functions represent the real and imaginary parts of the polylogarithm, on the unit circle:

This is easily seen by appealing to the series definition of the polylogarithm.

By Euler's theorem,

and by de Moivre's Theorem (De Moivre's formula)

Hence

Relation to the polygamma function

The Clausen functions are intimately connected to the polygamma function. Indeed, it is possible to express Clausen functions as linear combinations of sine functions and polygamma functions. One such relation is shown here, and proven below:

Let  and  be positive integers, such that  is a rational number , then, by the series definition for the higher order Clausen function (of even index):

We split this sum into exactly p-parts, so that the first series contains all, and only, those terms congruent to  the second series contains all terms congruent to  etc., up to the final p-th part, that contain all terms congruent to 

We can index these sums to form a double sum:

Applying the addition formula for the sine function,  the sine term in the numerator becomes:

Consequently,

To convert the inner sum in the double sum into a non-alternating sum, split in two in parts in exactly the same way as the earlier sum was split into p-parts:

For , the polygamma function has the series representation

So, in terms of the polygamma function, the previous inner sum becomes:

 

Plugging this back into the double sum gives the desired result:

Relation to the generalized logsine integral

The generalized logsine integral is defined by:

In this generalized notation, the Clausen function can be expressed in the form:

Kummer's relation

Ernst Kummer and Rogers give the relation

Relation to the Lobachevsky function

The Lobachevsky function Λ or Л is essentially the same function with a change of variable:

though the name "Lobachevsky function" is not quite historically accurate, as Lobachevsky's formulas for hyperbolic volume used the slightly different function

Relation to Dirichlet L-functions
This allows relations between certain Dirichlet L-functions to be easily computed.

Series acceleration
A series acceleration for the Clausen function is given by

Here,  is the Riemann zeta function. A more rapidly convergent form is given by

Convergence is aided by the fact that  approaches zero rapidly for large values of n.  Both forms are obtainable through the types of resummation techniques used to obtain rational zeta series .

Special values

Recall the Barnes G-function and Catalan's constant K. Some special values include

In general, from the Barnes G-function reflection formula,

Equivalently, using Euler's reflection formula for the gamma function, then,

Generalized special values

Some special values for higher order Clausen functions include

Integrals of the direct function

The following integrals are easily proven from the series representations of the Clausen function:

Fourier-analytic methods can be used to find the first moments of the square of the function  on the interval :

Here  denotes the multiple zeta function.

Integral evaluations involving the direct function

The examples listed below follow directly from the integral representation of the Clausen function, and the proofs require little more than basic trigonometry, integration by parts, and occasional term-by-term integration of the Fourier series definitions of the Clausen functions.

References

 

 
 Leonard Lewin, (Ed.). Structural Properties of Polylogarithms (1991)  American Mathematical Society, Providence, RI. 
 
   
 
 
 
 
 

Zeta and L-functions